Semčice is a municipality and village in Mladá Boleslav District in the Central Bohemian Region of the Czech Republic. It has about 800 inhabitants.

References

External links

Official website

Villages in Mladá Boleslav District